The Richmond Symphony is based in Richmond, Virginia and is the largest performing arts organization in Central Virginia and one of the nation's leading regional orchestras. The organization includes a full-time orchestra with more than 70 musicians, the Richmond Symphony Chorus with 150 volunteer members, and the Richmond Symphony Youth Orchestra programs with more than 260 student participants.  Each season, approximately 200,000 community members enjoy live concerts and radio broadcasts by the Richmond Symphony, and 55,000 students and teachers participate in the Symphony's educational outreach programs.

The Richmond Symphony's Music Director is Valentina Peleggi (since 2020), with Chia-Hsuan Lin as Associate Conductor (since 2016). Previous Music Directors include Edgar Schenkman (1957–71), Jacques Houtmann (1971-86), George Manahan (1987–98), Mark Russell Smith (1999-2009), and Steven Smith (2010-2019). Previous Associate Conductors include William Henry Curry, Peter Bay, Marin Alsop, Thomas Wilkins, Eckart Preu, Clark Etienne Suttle, Sarah Hatsuko Hicks, Erin Freeman, and Keitaro Harada. Its Executive Director is Lacey Huszcza.

The Symphony has performed alongside internationally renowned musicians such as Claudio Arrau, Mason Bates, Joshua Bell, Carter Brey, Yefim Bronfman, Aldo Ciccolini, Aaron Copland, Emerson String Quartet, Pierre Fournier, Denyce Graves, Ani Kavafian, Kate Lindsey, Yo-Yo Ma, Edgar Meyer, Jessye Norman, Itzhak Perlman, Jean-Pierre Rampal, Christopher Riley, Leonard Rose, Shanghai String Quartet, Gil Shaham, Joseph Silverstein, Dmitry Sitkovetsky, Isaac Stern, William Grant Still, Jean-Yves Thibaudet, Elena Urioste, Jason Vieaux, André Watts, Julian Lloyd Webber, Tony Bennett, Ray Charles, the Dave Matthews Band, Aretha Franklin, Marvin Hamlisch, Bruce Hornsby, Jubilant Sykes, and Cleo Laine.

The Richmond Symphony was founded in 1957. The Symphony performed only three concerts in its inaugural season. The Richmond Symphony Chorus, founded in 1971, gave its first performance under the direction of Robert Shaw; its directors have been Dr. James Erb (1971-2007) and Dr. Erin R. Freeman (since 2007). The Richmond Symphony Youth Orchestra Program includes four ensembles of elementary to secondary school students.

As a nonprofit corporation, the Richmond Symphony is partially supported by the Virginia Commission for the Arts and the National Endowment for the Arts.

The orchestra performs five concert series: Masterworks, made up of new and traditional symphonic repertoire engaging some of the best classical guest artists in the industry; Metro Collection Series, made up of beloved chamber music and highlighting Richmond Symphony musicians as soloists in a more intimate setting; Pops, featuring popular guest artists and classical and pop repertoire; LolliPops, a family-friendly concert series; and Rush-Hour, one-hour casual concerts in the tasting room at Hardywood Park Craft Brewery. The Richmond Symphony also gives special concerts and tours throughout central, western and southern Virginia.

In 2015 the Richmond Symphony launched its nationally recognized "Big Tent"  initiative that brings concerts and festivals to communities throughout the Richmond region. As of December 2019, "Big Tent" community festivals have reached tens-of-thousands of audiences members, generating more than 150 community partnerships and helped to raise over $400,000 for the purchase of 363 instruments and in support of arts programming in Richmond Public Schools. By the time the pilot period of the program is complete in 2019-20, the Symphony anticipates having raised over $500,000 in donations and buying more than 400 instruments to outfit all 32 RPS elementary and middle schools with a full string orchestra. The "Big Tent" program was a major factor in the Richmond Symphony being named a leader in orchestra innovation by the League of American Orchestras through its Futures Fund Initiative.

See also

 List of symphony orchestras
 Big Five (orchestras)
 Richmond Symphony Youth Orchestra
 Karen Johnson (violinist)

References

External links
Official Web Site

Musical groups established in 1957
American orchestras
Performing arts in Virginia
1957 establishments in Virginia
Culture of Richmond, Virginia